LifeLock 400 may refer to several NASCAR events:
Overton's 400 as the LifeLock.com 400 (July, 2008-2010), at Chicagoland Speedway in Joliet, Illinois
FireKeepers Casino 400 as the LifeLock 400 (June, 2008-2009), at Michigan International Speedway in Brooklyn, Michigan
Hollywood Casino 400 as LifeLock 400 (September 2007), at Kansas Speedway in Kansas City, Kansas